The 1933–34 Indiana Hoosiers men's basketball team represented Indiana University. Their head coach was Everett Dean, who was in his 10th year. The team played its home games in The Fieldhouse in Bloomington, Indiana, and was a member of the Big Ten Conference.

The Hoosiers finished the regular season with an overall record of 13–7 and a conference record of 6–6, finishing 5th in the Big Ten Conference.

Roster

Schedule/Results

|-
!colspan=8| Regular Season
|-

References

Indiana
Indiana Hoosiers men's basketball seasons
1933 in sports in Indiana
1934 in sports in Indiana